Hana Guy (born 8 June 1969) is a New Zealand former professional tennis player. Before marriage she played under the name Hana Adámková.

Biography
Originally competing for her native Czechoslovakia, Guy started playing professional tournaments in 1986. She reached a best singles ranking of 214 in the world and featured in the qualifying draw of all four grand slam events during her career. Her only WTA Tour main draw appearance came in doubles, at Schenectady in 1990.

In 1991 she married New Zealand tennis player Steve Guy, who were both at the time playing for the same tennis club in Offenbacher, Germany.

Guy played two Fed Cup matches for New Zealand in 1992. On debut, she was well beaten by Anke Huber as Germany went on to demote New Zealand to the World Group playoffs. In the playoff against Paraguay she lost her match to Larissa Schaerer in three sets.

Both Guy and husband Steve run a tennis school in the German city of Fulda.

ITF finals

Singles (1–0)

Doubles (2–1)

References

External links
 
 
 

1969 births
Living people
New Zealand female tennis players
Czechoslovak female tennis players
New Zealand people of Czech descent
New Zealand expatriate sportspeople in Germany